Granville Park may refer to:

Granville Park, Merrylands in Sydney, Australia
Vancouver Lawn Tennis Club in Canada